Placer Hills Union Elementary School District  is a public school district based in Placer County, California, United States.

External links
 

School districts in Placer County, California